Nugandaširi (fl. 1467) was a queen of Kara Del in modern-day Xinjiang and ruled Kara Del as queen mother in 1460–1467. She was the only female ruler of the Kara Del.

References

15th-century women rulers
Year of birth unknown
Year of death unknown